Tsakonas is a surname of Greek origin. Notable people with the surname include:

Kostas Tsakonas (1943–2015), Greek actor
Lykourgos-Stefanos Tsakonas (born 1990), Greek sprinter

See also
Tsakonians

Greek-language surnames